The following is a list of the 60 municipalities (comuni) of the Province of Pesaro and Urbino, Marche, Italy, following the transfer of seven (Casteldelci, Maiolo, Novafeltria, Pennabilli, San Leo, Sant'Agata Feltria and Talamello) to the Province of Rimini in August 2009.

List

See also
List of municipalities of Italy

References

 
Pesaro e Urbino